In statistics, the coverage probability is a technique for calculating a confidence interval which is the proportion of the time that the interval contains the true value of interest.  For example, suppose our interest is in the mean number of months that people with a particular type of cancer remain in remission following successful treatment with chemotherapy. The confidence interval aims to contain the unknown mean remission duration with a given probability. This is the "confidence level" or "confidence coefficient" of the constructed interval which is effectively the "nominal coverage probability" of the procedure for constructing confidence intervals. The "nominal coverage probability" is often set at 0.95. The coverage probability is the actual probability that the interval contains the true mean remission duration in this example.  

If all assumptions used in deriving a confidence interval are met, the nominal coverage probability will equal the coverage probability (termed "true" or "actual" coverage probability for emphasis).  If any assumptions are not met, the actual coverage probability could either be less than or greater than the nominal coverage probability.  When the actual coverage probability is greater than the nominal coverage probability, the interval is termed a conservative (confidence) interval, if it is less than the nominal coverage probability, the interval is termed "anti-conservative", or "permissive".

A discrepancy between the coverage probability and the nominal coverage probability frequently occurs when approximating a discrete distribution with a continuous one.  The construction of binomial confidence intervals is a classic example where coverage probabilities rarely equal nominal levels.  For the binomial case, several techniques for constructing intervals have been created.  The Wilson or Score confidence interval is one well known construction based on the normal distribution.  Other constructions include the Wald, exact, Agresti-Coull, and likelihood intervals.  While the Wilson interval may not be the most conservative estimate, it produces average coverage probabilities that are equal to nominal levels while still producing a comparatively narrow confidence interval.   

The "probability" in coverage probability is interpreted with respect to a set of hypothetical repetitions of the entire data collection and analysis procedure.  In these hypothetical repetitions, independent data sets following the same probability distribution as the actual data are considered, and a confidence interval is computed from each of these data sets; see Neyman construction. The coverage probability is the fraction of these computed confidence intervals that include the desired but unobservable parameter value.

Formula 
The construction of the confidence interval ensures that the probability of finding the true parameter  in the sample dependent interval  is (at least)

See also 
 Binomial proportion confidence interval
 Confidence distribution
 False coverage rate
 Interval estimation

References 

Estimation theory